Gottne IF  is a Swedish football club based in Gottne. The team plays in the Division 2, the four tier league in the country, as of 2022.

References

External links
Official website
Soccerway profile

Football clubs in Sweden